Wushu was contested by both men and women at the 2002 Asian Games in Busan, South Korea from October 10 to October 13, 2002. It was competed in the disciplines of Taijiquan, Taijijian, Changquan, Daoshu, Jianshu, Gunshu, Qiangshu, Nanquan, Nangun, Nandao, and Sanshou. All events were held at Dongseo University Minseok Sports Center.

Schedule

Medalists

Men's taolu

Men's sanda

Women's taolu

Medal table

Participating nations
A total of 142 athletes from 23 nations competed in wushu at the 2002 Asian Games:

References

2002 Asian Games Report, Pages 786–796

External links
Official website

 
2002
2002 Asian Games events
2002 in wushu (sport)